Kostas Peristeridis (born 24 January 1991) is a Greek professional footballer who plays as a goalkeeper for Super League 2 club Niki Volos.

Career
Born in Chania, Greece, Peristeridis moved to the Netherlands to play football at the age 16. After initially signing with FC Volendam, Peristeridis joined Almere City FC in 2010, making 10 Eerste Divisie appearances in his first season with the club.

Peristeridis has appeared for the Greece national under-21 football team.

Honours 
PAS Giannina

 Super League Greece 2: 2019–20

References

External links
Profile at Voetbal International

1991 births
Living people
Greek footballers
Greek expatriate footballers
Eerste Divisie players
FC Volendam players
Almere City FC players
PAS Giannina F.C. players
Niki Volos F.C. players
Association football goalkeepers
Footballers from Chania